Ana Carolina is the debut album by Brazilian singer-songwriter, arranger and record producer Ana Carolina.

In addition to the artist's own compositions and her musical partners, such as Totonho Villeroy, Paulinho Moska and Alvin L., this album contains remakes of songs by renowned artists such as Chico Buarque, Lulu Santos e Pato Fu. It sold 125 000 copies in Brazil, being certified platinum.

Track listing

Personnel 

 Sacha Amback – arranger, keyboards, program, choir arrangement
 Guto Antunes – photo assistance
 Fabio Arruda – graphic design
 Aldivas Ayres – trombone
 Bernardo Bessler – violin
 Ana Carolina – guitar, arranger, vocals, pandeiro, concept
 Lui Coimbra – cello
 Walter Costa – loop, sound technician
 Jorge Davidson – art direction
 Dunga – bass
 Nelson Faria – guitar
 Vitor Farias – digital editing, mixing
 Emil Ferreira – graphic coordinator
 Ricardo Garcia – mastering
 Milton Guedes – alto sax, vocals
 Fábio Henriques – mixing
 Jovi – tamborim
 Jurema – vocals
 Jussara – vocals
 Paulo Lima – technical assistance
 Marco Lobo – percussion
 Alexandre Lucas – vocals
 Macaé – tenor sax
 William Magalhaes – keyboards, program
 Arthur Maia – bass
 Theo Marés – studio assistant
 Marcelo Martins – tenor sax
 Mauro Rufino Martins – violin
 Cláudio Menezes – production assistant
 Paulinho Moska – guitar
 Marcelo Neves – arranger
 Paschoal Perrota – arranger
 Hugo Vargas Pilger – cello
 Nilo Romero – arranger, producer, digital editing, loop, sound technician
 Eduardo Souto Neto – choir arrangement
 Marcos Suzano – percussion, pandeiro, tamborim
 Greg VanDerlans – photography
 Totonho Villeroy – arranger
 Mac William – drums

Certifications

References 

1999 debut albums
Ana Carolina albums
Bertelsmann Music Group albums